Group 6 consisted of six of the 50 teams entered into the European zone: Czech Republic, Faroe Islands, Malta, Slovakia, Spain, and Yugoslavia. These six teams competed on a home-and-away basis for two of the 15 spots in the final tournament allocated to the European zone, with the group's winner and runner-up claiming those spots.

Standings

Results

Notes

External links 
Group 6 Detailed Results at RSSSF

6
1996–97 in Czech football
1997–98 in Czech football
1996 in Faroe Islands football
1997 in Faroe Islands football
1996–97 in Maltese football
1997–98 in Maltese football
1996–97 in Slovak football
1997–98 in Slovak football
1996–97 in Spanish football
Qual
1996–97 in Yugoslav football
Qual
1995–96 in Maltese football
1995–96 in Yugoslav football